Peranabrus is a genus of shield-backed katydids in the family Tettigoniidae. There is one described species in Peranabrus, P. scabricollis from North America.

References

Further reading

 

Tettigoniinae
Articles created by Qbugbot